The first 'Dekanawida (YT-334/YTB-334) was a tug in the United States Navy during World War II.

The ship was built and delivered in 1904 by Neafie & Levy Ship & Engine Building Co., Philadelphia, Pennsylvania for the US Army as the Mine planter  USAMP Colonel George Armistead.  Armistead was sold by the U.S. Army Mine Planter Service in 1935 to Foss Towing and Barge Co., Portland, Oregon which renamed the ship Mary Foss. The Mary Foss was acquired by the Navy 2 November 1942 and placed in service as Dekanawida. She was employed in the 14th Naval District, and on 15 May 1944 was reclassified YTB-334'. Dekanawida was stricken from the Navy List on 8 May 1946,  delivered to the Maritime Commission for disposal, reacquired by Foss Maritime and renamed as the Agnes Foss. After sale in 1972 to a buyer in the Philippines the ship was operated as the Celtic''.

Notes

References

 
 Foss Maritime

Mine planters of the United States Army
Tugs of the United States Navy
1904 ships